Scranton Chamber of Commerce Building is a historic commercial building located at Scranton, Lackawanna County, Pennsylvania. It was built in 1926, and alterations were made around 1991.

It was added to the National Register of Historic Places in 2011.

References

External links
Greater Scranton Chamber of Commerce website

Commercial buildings on the National Register of Historic Places in Pennsylvania
Commercial buildings completed in 1926
Buildings and structures in Scranton, Pennsylvania
National Register of Historic Places in Lackawanna County, Pennsylvania